The Ven. John Malcolm Alexander Graham (1849-1924) was Archdeacon of Stoke from 1908 until his death on 2 December 1931.

Graham was born in Margate; educated at Rossall School and Brasenose College, Oxford; and ordained in 1879. After a curacy at Newcastle-under-Lyme he held incumbencies at Burslem, Shrewton and Trentham.

References

People educated at Rossall School
19th-century English Anglican priests
20th-century English Anglican priests
1931 deaths
Alumni of Brasenose College, Oxford
Archdeacons of Stoke
1849 births